Hartmut Welker (born 27 October 1941) is a German operatic bass-baritone

Career 
Welker was born in Velbert. Before he decided to study singing, he had learned and practiced the profession as a toolmaker. At the age of 28 he began studying singing at the Hochschule für Musik und Tanz Köln with Else Bischof. He made his stage debut in 1974 at the Theater Aachen in the role of  Monterone in Verdi's Rigoletto, stepping in for an ill singer. From 1975 to 1977, he was engaged as a chorus singer at the Aachen Opera House, where he also performed small solo parts. He made his official debut there in 1977 as Renato in Verdi's Un ballo in maschera. He worked at the Aachen theatre until 1980 and was subsequently engaged for three years at the Badisches Staatstheater Karlsruhe, to which he later belonged as a permanent guest. During these years he had numerous guest appearances in major opera houses around the world, such as the Metropolitan Opera in New York City, the Teatro alla Scala in Milan, the Royal Opera House Covent Garden in London, the Opéra Bastille in Paris, the Vienna State Opera, Berlin State Opera and Hamburg State Opera, as well as the Bayreuth Festival, the Salzburg Festival, the Bregenz Festival and the Edinburgh Festival.

Welker has been a member of the Hamburgische Staatsoper since 1982, the Vienna State Opera since 1985 and the Deutsche Oper Berlin since 1987. He also performs in concerts and television productions.

Hartmut Welker is the father of the director Sebastian Welker.

References

External links 
 Hartmut Welker Hilbert agent)
 Hartmut Welker Website of the Bayerischen Staatsoper
 
  
 Hartmut Welker Opera Musica

1941 births
Living people
People from Velbert
Operatic bass-baritones
20th-century German  male opera singers